Devi Singh can refer to:

 Devi Singh (sport shooter) (born 1932), Indian sports shooter
 Devi Singh (wrestler) (born 1926), Indian wrestler